Sforza Castle (Italian: Castello Sforzesco) is a castle in Milan, northern Italy built in the 15th century by Francesco Sforza, Duke of Milan, on the remnants of a 14th-century fortification.

It may also refer to:

Sforza Castle Pinacoteca
Visconti-Sforza Castle (Novara)
Visconti-Sforza Castle (Vigevano)

See also
Visconti Castle (disambiguation)
List of castles in Italy